Matilda De Angelis (born 11 September 1995) is an Italian actress and singer. Her credits include the films Italian Race and Rose Island, and the television miniseries The Law According to Lidia Poët, and the The Undoing.

Career
She started playing guitar and violin at the age of thirteen. She attended the liceo scientifico "Enrico Fermi" in Bologna.

In 2011, De Angelis began singing in the band Rumba de Bodas. The band also recorded an album, Karnaval Fou, which was released in 2014.

In 2015, she was noticed by director Matteo Rovere, who cast her as the lead in his film Italian Race (2016). According to De Angelis, Rovere «saw some of my pictures on Facebook and he wanted to meet me because they were searching for the leading role in this new film and the director didn't want to get a professional actress because he needed a specific dialect from a specific region in Italy (Emilia Romagna). So, I went to the audition and after, he told me: "You have to do it again, but with a script" and I had three or four auditions after that and then, I got the part». For her debut role, De Angelis was nominated at 2017 David di Donatello for Best Actress; she also wrote and sang the film's song "Seventeen", which received a nomination for Best Original Song at the same competition. She was also awarded with a Flaiano Prize and a Nastro d'argento for the Best Newcomer.

In 2017, she played the role of Brittia in the ensemble comedy film The Prize by Alessandro Gassmann. In 2018, she starred in the drama film Youtopia, where she played a teenage girl selling her virginity online in order to save her family. In 2020, she was in the main cast of the HBO's television miniseries The Undoing and starred in the Netflix's original film Rose Island, directed by Sydney Sibilia. For her role in Rose Island she was awarded with the David di Donatello for Best Supporting Actress.

She co-hosted the first evening of the Sanremo Festival 2021 alongside Amadeus.

She will star alongside Liev Schreiber in the upcoming film adaptation of Ernest Hemingway's novel with the same name; Across the River and into the Trees.

She is an atheist.

Filmography

Film

TV series

Music videos

Discography

Singles

References

External links 
 

1995 births
Italian atheists
Italian film actresses
Italian television actresses
Living people
21st-century Italian actresses
Actors from Bologna